Goldsworthy is a Cornish name, from the Cornish language "gol-erewy", meaning field of feast. Notable people with the name include:

Surname:
Adrian Goldsworthy (born 1969), British historian
Andy Goldsworthy (born 1956), British artist
Anna Goldsworthy (born 1974), Australian pianist and writer, daughter of Peter Goldsworthy
Bill Goldsworthy (1944–1996), Canadian ice hockey player
Burrington Goldsworthy (c. 1705 – 1774), 18th century English Consul at Leghorn and later Cadiz; father of Philip Goldsworthy
Clifford R. Goldsworthy (1865–1944), American politician
Denise Goldsworthy (born 1964/1965), Australian business executive
Harry E. Goldsworthy (1914–2022), American Air Force lieutenant general
 John Goldsworthy (1884–1958), British actor
Julia Goldsworthy (born 1978), British politician
Kay Goldsworthy (born 1956), Australian Anglican bishop
Kerryn Goldsworthy (born 1953), Australian writer
Peter Goldsworthy (born 1951), Australian author, father of Anna Goldsworthy
Philip Goldsworthy (c. 1737 – 1801), General, Colonel of The Royals, Chief Equerry to King George III
Robert F. Goldsworthy (1917–2014), American politician
Roger Goldsworthy (1839–1900), President of Nevis; Governor of Saint Lucia; Governor of the British Honduras; and Governor of the Falkland Islands
Samuel Goldsworthy (1855–1889), Wales international rugby player
Vesna Goldsworthy (born c. 1961), Serbian writer
Walter Tuckfield Goldsworthy (1837–1911), British Army officer and Conservative Party politician
W. Brandt Goldsworthy, the pioneer of pultrusion

Given name:
Goldsworthy Gurney (1793–1875), surgeon, chemist, lecturer, consultant, architect, builder and British gentleman scientist and inventor
Goldsworthy Lowes Dickinson (1862–1932), Historian and political activist

Fictional characters:
Eli Goldsworthy, character in Degrassi

Cornish-language surnames